Bechterew may refer to:

 Bekhterev, surname
 Ankylosing spondylitis, previously known as Bechterew's disease